The economy of Liverpool encompasses a wide range of economic activity that occurs within and surrounding the city of Liverpool, England. With a population of over 1.3 million in its Larger Urban Zone, and a metropolitan area population of 2,241,000, Liverpool is one of the largest cities in the United Kingdom and sits at the centre of the broader Merseyside economic area, which is itself one of the two core economies of the North west of England. In 2017 the Liverpool City Region experienced the UK's highest growth in real GVA, increasing by 3.3%.

Service sector 
In common with much of the rest of the UK today, Liverpool's economy is dominated by service sector industries, both public and private. In 2007, over 60% of all employment in the city was in the public administration, education, health, banking, finance and insurance sectors.

Public administration, Education and Health 
Public Administration, Education and Health are combined, the single largest employment sector within Liverpool's economy, accounting for approximately 40% of all jobs in the city. Despite a recent fall in the number of jobs, the level of employment in these sectors remains higher than the average for the other core cities of England.

Liverpool is an important centre for public administration having offices from several government departments and non-departmental public bodies, in addition to local government agencies. Agencies such as HM Passport Office, Criminal Records Bureau, and Her Majesty's Revenue and Customs all have offices in the city.

Banking, Finance and Insurance 
The banking, finance and insurance sectors are one of the fastest growing areas of Liverpool's economy with a 5.3% increase in jobs in these areas 2006/07. Major private sector service industry concerns have also invested in Liverpool especially the financial services sector with Barclays, JPMorgan, Alliance & Leicester, Royal Bank of Scotland Group and the Bank of Ireland either opening or expanding their sites, a number of major call centres have opened in recent years too and the professional advice sector.

Tourism 

Tourism is a major factor in the economy. It is estimated that in 2018 38m visitors came to the city, an estimated 7.4% increase in numbers and a 5% increase in the number of staying visitors, up to 2.7m. It is estimated that in 2017 foreign tourism brought in £358 million to the local economy.
The increase in tourism has led to a great increase in the provision of high quality services such as hotels, restaurants and clubs. In 2008, Liverpool city centre had 37 hotels, apart hotels and guesthouses offering a total of 3,481 bedrooms. By 2017 this figure had risen to 67 locations with 6,600 bedrooms available. Several other hotels are planned to open in the next two years leading to an estimated 14% increase in the number of rooms available.

Liverpool is one of the few cities in the world where cruise liners can berth in the city centre, and from 2008 a significant number of ships called at Liverpool's cruise liner terminal, including the Grand Princess and the Queen Elizabeth 2.  From 2013 Liverpool was able to offer turnaround operations from the cruise liner terminal attracting cruise passengers from the north of England and the Midlands. Liverpool City Council unveiled preliminary plans for a new £50 million cruise terminal in September 2017. The new facility is intended to be built slightly further down the Mersey than the exiting terminal, at Princes Dock where the old wooden landing stage currently lies. The new terminal would be able to handle ships with up to 3,600 passengers and would include dedicated passport control as well as a cafe. Surveying work for the new facility began in May 2018 with work expected to start in autumn of the year with an estimated completion date of 2020.

Liverpool and its boroughs have a large number of sandy beaches accessible by Merseyrail, which prove popular in the summer months.

Film industry 

The buildings and districts of Liverpool attract film makers, who regularly use Liverpool to double for cities around the world making it the second most filmed city in the UK.
2019 saw filming bring an estimated £17.9m into the city's enconomy, with 324 productions racking up a total of 1,750 production days.
In June 2018, Twickenham Studios announced plans to take 8,000 sq metres of space in the Littlewoods Pools building. They will also use two new 2,000-sq metre sound stages which are to be built next to the main building.

Retail 

Liverpool's main shopping area consists of numerous streets and shopping centres. Amongst the larger predominantly retail orientated streets in Liverpool city centre are Church Street, Lord Street, Bold Street and Mathew Street. Liverpool One opened fully in October 2008 being the redevelopment of a large part of the postcode area L1—hence the name. It is also partly built on the old Chavasse Park, but much of the park still remains. Previous to the opening of the Liverpool One complex, St. John's Shopping Centre was the largest shopping centre in Liverpool, it still remains the largest covered shopping centre in the city. Clayton Square Shopping Centre is also located in the very centre of the city as is Metquarter, an upmarket shopping centre consisting primarily of boutique stores which opened in 2006. New Strand Shopping Centre and New Mersey Shopping Park are two other large shopping complexes in the Liverpool Urban Area, in Bootle and Speke respectively.

Knowledge economy 

Growth in the areas of New Media has been helped by the existence of a relatively large computer game development community. Sony based one of only a handful of European PlayStation research and development centres in the city, after buying out noted software publisher Psygnosis. According to a 2006 issue of industry magazine 'Edge' (issue 162), the first professional quality PlayStation software developer's kits were largely programmed by Sony's Liverpool studio.

The Baltic Triangle, an area of the city centre that used to be associated with traditional industry, is now a hub of creative and digital businesses. Based in this area are companies such as games developer MilkyTea, and entertainment journalism website Karibu.

Manufacturing sector 
Car-manufacturing also takes place in the city at the Halewood plant where the Jaguar X-Type and Land Rover Freelander models are assembled. The X-Type ceased production in 2010 however, the new Range Rover Evoque filled the gap when production began in the Spring of 2011.

Port of Liverpool 

The owner of Liverpool's port and airport, Peel Holdings, announced on 6 March 2007 that it had plans to redevelop the city's northern dock area with a scheme entitled Liverpool Waters, which may see the creation of 17,000 jobs and £5.5bn invested in the vicinity over a 50-year period. This is coupled with a sister scheme on the other side of the River Mersey, called Wirral Waters. 

In recent years, the Port of Liverpool has seen somewhat of a revival, with both Japanese firm NYK and Danish firm Maersk Line locating their UK headquarters to the city.

The port was expanded with the construction of Liverpool2, a post-Panamax container terminal for ships wider than the Panama Canal locks. It is capable of handling ships carrying 13,500 containers, compared to the previous limit of 3,500.

Notes

References